Lohmeyer is a German surname. Notable people with the surname include:

 Ernst Lohmeyer (1890–1946), German scholar and theologian
 Hans Lohmeyer (1881–1968), German jurist and Lord Mayor of Königsberg
 John Lohmeyer (born 1951), American football player
 Peter Lohmeyer (born 1962), German actor

German-language surnames